"Where Would You Be" is a song written by Rachel Proctor and Rick Ferrell, and recorded by American country music singer Martina McBride.  It was released in May 2002 as the third single from McBride's Greatest Hits compilation album.  The song peaked at number 3 on the U.S. Billboard Hot Country Singles & Tracks (now Hot Country Songs chart) chart.

Content
Producer Paul Worley thought that the song "challenged Martina more than any song ever has", and McBride said that she enjoyed "the rawness" of it.

Music video
The music video was directed by Morris Abraham and premiered in May 2002.

Charts
"Where Would You Be" debuted at number 45 on the U.S. Billboard Hot Country Songs for the week of May 11, 2002.

Year-end charts

References

2002 singles
2001 songs
Martina McBride songs
Songs written by Rachel Proctor
Song recordings produced by Paul Worley
RCA Records Nashville singles